The 2016 Girabola was the 38th season of top-tier football in Angola. The season ran from 19 February to 5 November 2016.

The league comprised 16 teams, the bottom three of which were relegated to the 2016 Provincial championships. 1º de Agosto won their first league title.

Teams
A total of 16 teams contested the league, including 13 sides from the 2015 season and three promoted from the 2015 Segundona - 4 de Abril do KK, Porcelana and 1º de Maio.

Recreativo do Libolo were the defending champions from the 2015 season.

Changes from 2015 season
Relegated: Bravos do Maquis, Domant FC, Sporting de Cabinda 
Promoted: 4 de Abril do KK, Porcelana, 1º de Maio

Stadiums and locations

League table

Results

Positions by round

Clubs season progress

Season statistics

Top scorers

Hat-tricks

References

External links
Girabola 2016 stats at jornaldosdesportos.sapo.ao
Federação Angolana de Futebol

Girabola seasons
Girabola
Angola